Franck Ondoa (born 3 November 2004) is a Cameroonian footballer who plays as a striker for AcInFoot and the Cameroon national football team.

References

2004 births
Living people
Cameroonian footballers
Association football forwards
Cameroon international footballers
Cameroon A' international footballers
2020 African Nations Championship players